Juttadinteria suavissima is a species of plant in the family Aizoaceae. It is endemic to Namibia.  Its natural habitat is cold desert.

References

Flora of Namibia
suavissima
Least concern plants
Taxonomy articles created by Polbot